Nuestra Belleza Veracruz 2010, was held at the Hotel Holliday Inn Poza Rica, Tihuatlán, Veracruz on July 28, 2010. At the conclusion of the final night of competition, Diana Botello of Boca del Río was crowned the winner. Botello  was crowned by outgoing Nuestra Belleza Veracruz titleholder, Fabiola Pinal. Seven contestants competed for the state title.

Results

Placements

Contestants

References

External links
Official Website

Nuestra Belleza México